La Cutufa was an illegal Chilean clandestine finance syndicate (dubbed after an official's dog) that offered investors, mostly officers of the Chilean army, tax-free interest rates of 20% a month. It was created by Major Patricio Castro Muñoz, a high-ranking official of the CNI (the Chilean secret police during the last 13 years of the Pinochet dictatorship), and was active from 1984 to 1989. After a dissatisfied investor, restaurant impresario Aurelio Sichel, was murdered by CNI agents, 4 generals and 16 officers were cashiered and 200 sanctioned. According to the claimers, during its five years of operation, the army gang handled $50 million.

See also
 Chile under Pinochet
 Hugo Salas Wenzel

References

External links
 Article Rechnung ohne Witwe in German magazine Der Spiegel on 26. November 1990, in German language, retrieved on 26. June 2011
 Article In Chile, Army Scandal May Damage Former Dictator Pinochet by Leslie Crawford in Chicago Tribune on November 23, 1990, retrieved on 26 June 2011
 Article Profile: Chile Trying to Live With Democracy ... and Pinochet : The dictator turned over power last year but he still commands the army. He just won't go away in Los Angeles Times by William R. Long, on February 5, 1991

Military history of Chile
Political scandals in Chile
Political history of Chile